Pollanisus marriotti is a moth of the family Zygaenidae. It is found in Australia, where it has been recorded from Victoria.

References

marriotti
Moths described in 2011
Moths of Australia